Bolintin-Deal is a commune located in Giurgiu County, Muntenia, Romania. It is composed of two villages, Bolintin-Deal and Mihai Vodă. At the 2011 census, 99.5% of inhabitants were Romanians and 0.4% Roma; the latter formed a higher percentage of the population before being driven away during ethnic clashes in 1991.

Natives
 Emanoil Bucuța

References

Communes in Giurgiu County
Localities in Muntenia